is a railway station in the city of Annaka, Gunma, Japan, operated by the East Japan Railway Company (JR East).

Lines

Station layout
The station has a single island platform with an elevated station building located above and at a right angle to the platforms. The station is unattended.

Platforms

History
Nishi-Matsuida Station opened on 1 April 1965. With the privatization of the Japanese National Railways (JNR) on 1 April 1987, the station came under the control of JR East.

Passenger statistics
In fiscal 2017, the station was used by an average of 267 passengers daily (boarding passengers only).

Surrounding area
 Former Matsuida Town Hall
 Matsuida Post Office

See also
 List of railway stations in Japan

References

External links
 
 JR East Station information 

Shin'etsu Main Line
Railway stations in Gunma Prefecture
Railway stations in Japan opened in 1965
Stations of East Japan Railway Company
Annaka, Gunma